Kakrud or Kakerud or Kak Rud may refer to:
 Kakrud, Amlash
 Kakerud, Rudsar